George Gaylord "Gale" Staley (May 2, 1899 – April 19, 1989) was a  Major League Baseball Second baseman. Staley played for the Chicago Cubs in the  season. In 7 career games, he had 11 hits in 26 at-bats. He batted left and threw right-handed.

Staley was born in De Pere, Wisconsin and died in Walnut Creek, California.

External links

1899 births
1989 deaths
Chicago Cubs players
Baseball players from Wisconsin
People from De Pere, Wisconsin